Gunnarnes is a seaside village on the island of Rolvsøya in the municipality of Måsøy in Troms og Finnmark county, Norway. There is a ferry between Gunnarnes and Havøysund.

See also
Gunnarnes Chapel

References

Villages in Finnmark
Måsøy